Nomita Chandy was an Indian social worker from Bangalore, known for her services towards the rehabilitation of destitute children.
 
Chandy was secretary of Ashraya, a non governmental organization, working mainly towards the rehabilitation to destitute children. Under the aegis of the organization, Chandy and her colleagues were successful in arranging for the legal adoption of 2000 children within the country and 1000 outside. The organization also runs a school, Neelbagh, and a safe crèche for the children of migrant workers and takes care of eight visually impaired children at the child care centre. The Government of India honored Nomita Chandy in 2011, with the fourth highest civilian award of Padma Shri.

Chandy died in May 2015 at Bengaluru.

References

External links
 

Living people
Recipients of the Padma Shri in social work
Social workers
Scholars from Bangalore
Educators from Karnataka
Women educators from Karnataka
20th-century Indian educators
20th-century Indian women
Activists from Karnataka
Indian children's rights activists
Social workers from Karnataka
20th-century women educators
1946 births